Todd and the Book of Pure Evil was a Canadian black comedy horror television series that follows a group of high school students who confront the effects of a demonic book. The series premiered on Space on September 29, 2010, with two back-to-back episodes. The series was created for television by Craig David Wallace, Charles Picco, and Anthony Leo.

The series is based on the short film of the same title written by Craig David Wallace and Max Reid, and directed by Wallace. The short film was produced through the Canadian Film Centre’s Short Dramatic Film Programme, and kicked off an international festival tour by premiering at the Toronto International Film Festival in 2003. The series was developed for television through the National Screen Institute's Totally TV Program. A pilot for Todd and the Book of Pure Evil was shot for Space in 2009 in Winnipeg, Manitoba. Like the low-budget short film, the series uses supernatural elements, profanity, graphic violence, and non-sequitur lines. Sci-fi veteran David Winning directed four episodes.

On April 4, 2011, Space announced that they had renewed Todd and the Book of Pure Evil for a second season, with principal photography being set for spring 2011. The new 13-episode season premiered on Space on October 30, 2011, at 10pm. In April 2012, it was announced that there would not be a third season, but following an Indiegogo campaign as well as additional funding being secured, an animated feature film was released to conclude the series on November 3, 2017.

Plot
Todd Smith, Curtis Weaver, Jenny Kolinsky, and Hannah Williams are students at Crowley High, the only high school in a small town secretly founded by Satanists. They encounter a cursed magical tome with a mind of its own called the Book of Pure Evil, which grants the wishes of those who hold it in dark and sinister ways they didn't intend. the teens team up in an attempt to track down and destroy the Book. Each episode revolves around a student at Crowley High using the Book to try to make their life better, though this usually results in chaos, mayhem, and bloodshed at the school. Todd and his gang then fight against whatever the Book has done, and try to keep Crowley High from being totally destroyed. Supposedly friendly school guidance counselor, Atticus Murphy helps them in their quest to destroy the Book, though secretly he is a member of the cabal of Satanists who run the town from behind the scenes and has been tasked with returning the Book of Pure Evil to their leader.

Cast
 Alex House as Todd Smith
 Billy Turnbull as Curtis Weaver
 Maggie Castle as Jenny Kolinsky
 Melanie Leishman as Hannah B. Williams
 Chris Leavins as Atticus Murphy, Jr.
 Jason Mewes as Jimmy the Janitor
 Dan Petronijevic as Brody
 Norman Yeung as Eddie
 Steve Arbuckle as Rob
 Julian Richings as Hooded Leader

Episodes

Season 1 (2010)

Season 2 (2011–12)

Production
Each episode was produced with two variations of the audio track: a pre-watershed version with "clean" replacement dialogue dubbed in by the actors, and the original uncensored version with profanity.

Film
Space announced in April 2012 that they had decided not to renew Todd for a third season. Due to this, the showrunners launched an Indiegogo campaign in May 2013, collecting over $120,000 to make an animated feature film to conclude the series, titled Todd and the Book of Pure Evil: The End of the End. The film was picked up for distribution by Raven Banner Entertainment, which initially stated that the film would hit Canadian theaters in Fall 2015. However, this failed to happen due to issues with securing additional funding, and the release was pushed back to October 2016. After another delay, the film received a theatrical release in Canada on November 3, 2017. A limited edition DVD was released in Canada on December 12, 2017, and the film was released digitally through Vimeo for audiences from both Canada and the United States on December 15, 2017.

International airdates
On May 2, 2011, Fearnet announced that it had picked up the rights to air the series in the United States beginning August 2, 2011. Season 2 began airing on Fearnet starting March 13, 2012 at 10pm. In 2015, the series re-aired in the U.S. on Chiller.

In February 2012, Syfy announced that it will be airing the series in the United Kingdom beginning March 6, 2012.

Home media
Entertainment One released the first season on DVD in Canada with a MSRP of $29.99. Special features include the original short film, cast Q&A, a blooper reel, outtakes, deleted/extended scenes from the musical, and cast/crew commentary tracks.

eOne released the season in the United States on February 28, 2012. Extras are listed as the original short film, cast Q&A, a blooper reel, outtakes, cast/crew commentary, and short promotional clips.

Amazon Video and iTunes United States added each episode after its US premiere date, in both standard definition and high definition, and the show is also available on Netflix, Vudu (US), and Zune Marketplace (US and Canada) at up to 1080p.

In addition, the first season can be viewed on Space's website or purchased on iTunes Canada in standard definition widescreen. The second season was added to iTunes Canada in HD on February 13, 2012.

The Original Score Soundtrack for season 1, which includes both score and the original songs heard in the musical, is sold on iTunes, Amazon, Zune, eMusic, and Napster.

Reception
The Winnipeg Sun described the show as having the "feel of Buffy the Vampire Slayer with potty-mouth ... [which] is a good thing," and went on to say the show "generally is good fun, if not quite good clean fun." The show's premiere became the highest-rated premiere for a SPACE original series ever, and was the highest-rated program on Non-Sports Specialty for the demo A18-49. The first season was nominated for eight Gemini Awards, of which it won Best Ensemble Performance in a Comedy Program or Series for "The Phantom of Crowley High".

Awards and nominations

Canadian Cinema Editors Awards

Canadian Comedy Awards

Canadian Screen Awards

Directors Guild of Canada Awards

Gemini Awards

Golden Sheaf Awards

Leo Awards

Writers Guild of Canada Awards

References

External links
 
 
 SPACE Channel page
 Watch the short film online at Ain't It Cool News
 Channel Canada Press Release announcing start of production

2010 Canadian television series debuts
2012 Canadian television series endings
2010s Canadian comedy television series
2010s Canadian high school television series
English-language television shows
Television series about teenagers
Television shows filmed in Winnipeg
Television series by Bell Media
CTV Sci-Fi Channel original programming
Canadian comedy horror television series